Ngalandou Diouf (var. Galandou Diouf) (14 September 1875 - 6 August 1941) born in Saint-Louis Senegal, was the first African elected official from the advent of colonialism in the territory of French West Africa.

Early life
Diouf was born to the aristocratic Diouf family. He was of Wolof and Serer background, and as a native of one of the Four Communes of Senegal considered part of France, was granted the (nominally) full rights of French citizenship. He began his career as a schoolteacher and minor government clerk but became progressively involved in politics.

Political career
Diouf was elected in 1909 to represent the commune of Rufisque at the advisory General Assembly (Conseil Général) of Saint-Louis, then capital of colonial Senegal. He was an editor of the influential "La Démocratie" newspaper, and founding editor of  "Le Sénégal".  As a journalist and political leader, he was the political godfather of Blaise Diagne, whose fame and political success quickly supplanted Diouf's own. Diouf and Diagne finally broke in 1928 over Diouf's view that Diagne had conceded too much to French interests, and over Diouf's increasingly anti-Communist and anti- French Socialist Party views. With the death of Blaise Diagne, Ngalandou Diouf was in 1934 elected to the French National Assembly, the seat formerly held by Diagne, leading a coalition of the Centre Left, small farmers, Senegalese veterans of the French military, and followers of the Tijaniyyah Sufi brotherhood which defeated the Socialist and Mouride brotherhood coalition of Lamine Guèye, the attorney who would later carry out much of Diagne's political program.

In the French National Assembly
In the Assembly, Diouf joined with the Gauche indépendante (Left Independents), connected to the Parti radical-socialiste of Camille Pelletan. With the German invasion of France in 1940, Diouf did not vote against the 10 July 1940 granting of power to the collaborationist regime of Marshal Petain, having already fled. Diouf had opposed the armistice with the Germans, even drafting an appeal on 19 June 1940 with the Guadeloupean Deputies Gratien Candace and Maurice Satineau to President Albert Lebrun that called on the government to continue the war in the colonies.  The Massilia Deputies, a rump of 27 Assembly members, including Diouf, Édouard Daladier, Georges Mandel, Jean Zay, and Pierre Mendès-France, boarded the Massilia, a ship chartered to transport Assembly members to Casablanca, where they planned to set up a government in exile. After disembarking at Port-Vendres, the group, including Diouf, were arrested by collaborationist officials, but Diouf was not deported to face trial with the leadership.

Later life
Ngalandou Diouf died in 1941. A large secondary school in Dakar and major streets in both  Dakar and Saint-Louis are named for him.

References

 Portions of this article were translated from the French language Wikipedia articles :fr:Ngalandou Diouf and :fr:Galandou Diouf.
 Lucie Gallistel Colvin. Historical Dictionary of Senegal. Scarecrow Press/ Metuchen. NJ - London (1981) 

1875 births
1941 deaths
People from Saint-Louis, Senegal
Senegalese politicians
Serer politicians
Members of the 15th Chamber of Deputies of the French Third Republic
Members of the 16th Chamber of Deputies of the French Third Republic
Black French politicians